James Ralph Williams (28 July 1878 – 21 December 1929) was a Welsh field hockey player from Cardiff, who competed in the 1908 Summer Olympics. In 1908 he won the bronze medal as member of the team Wales.

References

External links
 
James Williams' profile at databaseOlympics
James Williams' profile at Sports Reference.com

1878 births
1929 deaths
Welsh male field hockey players
Olympic field hockey players of Great Britain
Field hockey players at the 1908 Summer Olympics
Olympic bronze medallists for Great Britain
Sportspeople from Cardiff
Olympic medalists in field hockey
Welsh Olympic medallists
Medalists at the 1908 Summer Olympics